Irdi Rapaj (born 15 September 1993), also known as Irdi Rrapaj or Irnti Rapai, is an Albanian footballer who plays as a striker.

References

External links

1993 births
Living people
Sportspeople from Fier
Albanian footballers
Association football forwards
KF Bylis Ballsh players
KF Apolonia Fier players
ND Gorica players
Panelefsiniakos F.C. players
Forlì F.C. players
Ravenna F.C. players
Proodeftiki F.C. players
Weston-super-Mare A.F.C. players
Wingate & Finchley F.C. players
Braintree Town F.C. players
Kategoria Superiore players
Slovenian PrvaLiga players
Serie C players
National League (English football) players
Isthmian League players
Albanian expatriate footballers
Expatriate footballers in Slovenia
Albanian expatriate sportspeople in Slovenia
Expatriate footballers in Italy
Albanian expatriate sportspeople in Italy
Expatriate footballers in Greece
Albanian expatriate sportspeople in Greece
Expatriate footballers in England
Albanian expatriate sportspeople in England